Kathrin Kohlhepp (born 1988), known by her artistic name DJane HouseKat, is a German female singer, DJ and musician specializing in electronic techno music. She is signed to Sony Music label.

Biography
DJane HouseKat used to play at clubs under the name DJane Candy before she released her single "My Party" and changed her name to DJane HouseKat. She learned about the DJ Set from her ex-boyfriend.

She became internationally famous for her 2012 dance hit "My Party", featuring British rapper Rameez. It was produced by Axel Konrad including sampling from the Michael Zager Band classic "Let's All Chant". Released in January 2012, it soon caught up in all night venues and has charted in Germany, Austria, Switzerland, and the Scandinavian countries. Pro Sieben station broadcast "My Party" in April as a promotional song for the station's Comedy Dienstag (meaning Comedy Tuesday), with the song jumping to Top 5 both in Germany and Austria the following week.

Discography

Singles

Remixes
2012: "Think About the Way" (Groove Coverage feat. Rameez)
2012: "Riot on the Dancefloor" (Groove Coverage)

References

External links

German DJs
Women DJs
1988 births
Living people
Date of birth missing (living people)
Electronic dance music DJs
21st-century German women singers